Carmella is a female given name. Notable people with the name include:

People
 Carmella DeCesare, a playmate for Playboy magazine
 Carmella Flöck, a courier for the Austrian Resistance during the Anschluss of 1938–1945.
 Carmella Marcella Garcia, Miss Continental Plus 1995
 Carmella Sabaugh, an American politician
 Carmella (wrestler), ring name of professional wrestler Leah Van Dale

Fictional characters
 Carmilla, a fictional vampire written in 1871 from the novel of the same name. Written by Sheridan Le Fanu
 Carmella Cammeniti, a fictional character from the soap opera Neighbours
 Carmella Unuscione, a fictional villain associated with the X-Men
 Carmella Soprano, wife of main character Tony Soprano from HBO series "The Sopranos"